Revisited is a 1960 album by Tom Lehrer, consisting of live recordings of all the songs from 1953's Songs by Tom Lehrer. The CD reissue of the album contains two additional tracks that Lehrer wrote and performed for the PBS television show The Electric Company (and produced and conducted by Joe Raposo).

In 2020, Lehrer donated all of his lyrics and music written by him to the public domain. He followed this on November 1, 2022 with all recording and performing rights of any kind, making all of his music that he has originally composed or performed free for anyone to use.

Track listing
 "Introduction"  – 3:27
 "I Wanna Go Back to Dixie"  – 2:56
 "The Wild West is Where I Want to Be"  – 2:31
 "The Old Dope Peddler"  – 1:42
 "Fight Fiercely, Harvard"  – 2:41
 "Lobachevsky"  – 4:19
 "The Irish Ballad"  – 5:13
 "The Hunting Song"  – 1:59
 "My Home Town"  – 2:58
 "When You are Old and Grey"  – 2:27
 "The Wiener Schnitzel Waltz"  – 2:21
 "I Hold Your Hand in Mine"  – 1:55
 "Be Prepared"  – 2:39
 "L-Y"  – 2:11 (CD bonus track)
 "Silent E"  – 1:30 (CD bonus track)

Notes 
On the original Lehrer Records release of Revisited, tracks 1–6 (side 1) were recorded live on November 23 & 24, 1959, in Kresge Auditorium at MIT in Cambridge, MA, while tracks 7–13 (side 2) were recorded live at two concerts during Lehrer's tour of Australia in spring 1960 (March 21 in Melbourne and May 4 in Sydney).

Because of issues with the sound quality of the Australian recordings, England's Decca Records assembled its release of the album solely from the MIT concert tapes. The Decca configuration was the basis for the 1990 Reprise/Warner Bros. CD reissue.

The cover photograph was taken at Royal Festival Hall in London, England, UK, after his performance there on June 29, 1960. Tracks 14 and 15 were recorded May 28, 1971, and December 14, 1972.

See also
Tom Lehrer
An Evening Wasted with Tom Lehrer
Songs By Tom Lehrer (album)

References

See also
Tom Lehrer
An Evening Wasted with Tom Lehrer
Songs By Tom Lehrer (album)

Tom Lehrer albums
1960 live albums
Reprise Records live albums
Albums conducted by Joe Raposo
Albums produced by Joe Raposo
1960s comedy albums
Live comedy albums
Albums free for download by copyright owner